Lincoln Andrew Hodgdon (born November 15, 1981) is a former American football offensive lineman for the Houston Texans of the National Football League.

Early life
Hodgdon was born in Palo Alto, California. He graduated in 2000 from Palo Alto High School, where he wrestled and participated in track and field in addition to starring on the football field.

College career
He chose to attend Arizona State University. With the Sun Devils, he played in 45 career games with 34 starts at both center and guard.

NFL career
He was selected by the Texans in the fifth round (151st overall) of the 2005 NFL Draft. He saw action in four games during his rookie season, starting three, before being placed on the injured reserve list. He increased his playing time in his second season, when he saw action in eight games and started in five. He was released just before the 2007 season, but was re-signed on December 4, 2007. Some time after, he was released once more. He was a guest on a Houston radio station in November 2013, where he talked about football and cycling.

References

1981 births
American football centers
Arizona State Sun Devils football players
Living people
Houston Texans players